The 2018 ITF Men's Circuit is the 2018 edition of the second tier tour for men's professional tennis. It is organised by the International Tennis Federation and is a tier below the ATP Tour. The ITF Men's Circuit includes tournaments with prize money ranging from $15,000 up to $25,000.

Schedule

January–March

April–June

July–September

October–December

Participating host nations

Tournament breakdown by event category

Point distribution

Statistics

These tables present the number of singles (S) and doubles (D) titles won by each player and each nation during the season. The players/nations are sorted by: 1) total number of titles (a doubles title won by two players representing the same nation counts as only one win for the nation); 2) a singles > doubles hierarchy; 3) alphabetical order (by family names for players).

To avoid confusion and double counting, these tables should be updated only after an event is completed.

Titles won by player

Titles won by nation

 Hady Habib started representing Lebanon in June, he won one singles title while representing the United States.
 Maxime Cressy started representing the United States in December, he won one singles title and eight doubles titles while representing France.

See also 
 2018 ATP World Tour
 2018 ATP Challenger Tour
 2018 ITF Women's Circuit

References

External links 
 International Tennis Federation (ITF)

 
2018
2018 in tennis